Chrysoteuchia funebrellus is a moth in the family Crambidae. It was described by Aristide Caradja in 1937. It is found in Yunnan, China.

References

Crambini
Moths described in 1937
Moths of Asia